Laghetto di Terra Nera is a lake in the Province of Livorno, Tuscany, Italy.

Lakes of Tuscany